"I Deserve It" is the lead single by American R&B singer Faith Evans, featuring female hip-hop recording artists Missy Elliott and her protégé Sharaya J, from Evans' sixth studio album, Incomparable (2014). The song was released via Evans' official SoundCloud account on June 25, 2014, and went on to be officially released in Russia and North America via iTunes on August 25, 2014. This marks the second time that both Evans and Elliott appear on a release together, the first being Evans' remixed single "Burnin' Up" in 2002.

Background
On August 6, 2013, Faith Evans confirmed in an interview with Studio Q that Missy Elliott would be one of the guest appearances on her sixth album Incomparable. In February 2014, Elliott herself confirmed that she would be featured on Evans' album. On March 14, 2014, Evans added that Elliott had contributed three tracks for the project and noted that one of them ("I Deserve It") happened to be "the last song on [the] album" that she recorded vocals for. Evans also added that "I Deserve It" would feature Elliott's protégée Sharaya J and "declared" the song as a "perfect embodiment of being able to still maintain what people know you for and the era that you’re from — but not sound dated."

Elaborating further on Missy Elliott's contribution to the single, Faith Evans disclosed: "When I first sent Missy [Elliott] the record, she was like, 'I don't know how to attack it,' and I'm like 'Girl bye' [...] Like, Missy do what you do. But she tried two other songs and went back to that one like, 'I like this one'." On June 15, 2014, Evans began a ten-day countdown for the single via her official Instagram account, and confirmed that the record would be released on June 25, 2014.

Composition
"I Deserve It" is a summertime R&B ladies' feel-good anthem that features "a piano and horn-driven beat", which samples Nina Simone's 1972 recording, "To Be Young, Gifted and Black". The song narrates Evans' praise of herself as she "vows not to settle when it comes to a man." Prior to the song's release, interviewers asked if the production to "I Deserve It" would be set in a mid-tempo or up-tempo style; Faith Evans replied that the song would be a "banger" and a "feel good" record.

Critical reception
The song has received generally favorable reviews with critics praising the track for being a "feel good" record laced with "summertime vibes". Zach Frydenlund of Complex praised "I Deserve It" for being an "R&B feel-good anthem that will brighten up your morning." Asada Nicome of The Source named the record a "catchy R&B [tune], that will have you bouncing and nodding your head". Rich Terell of Examiner took note of Evans' approach for accumulating the attention of a much younger generation. Terell also praised Evans for "snatching wigs first and asking questions later," with the release of "I Deserve It", which was described by Terell as a "summer-smash". Julian Riedel of German magazine Ampya complimented the single's motto, "make it hot for the summer", and praised the song's production as "classic, timeless mid-tempo R&B" intertwined "with an airy piano-strumming" instrumental coupled with "the typical Missy [Elliott] touch." Riedel also described Faith Evans' vocals as "smoky-sweet soprano" and noted "I Deserve It" as a "self-empower[ing] anthem". Critics also applauded Missy Elliott's guest appearance on the record, with Rap-Up noting Elliott "channel[ing] Salt-N-Pepa on her electrifying verse," and Frydenlund praising Elliott for "[going] in on her verse," and "reiterat[ing] the fact that [Elliott] hasn't lost a step." DirectLyrics jokingly wrote, "Where's my oxygen mask? I'm hyperventilating," in response to Elliott's guest appearance on the record. DirectLyrics also praised both Elliott and Sharaya J for "add[ing] a nice flavor thanks to their upbeat rap verses." Additionally, the song and accompanying music video met favorable reception from musicians like Leondre Devries of teen boy band Bars and Melody, where he stated via YouTube that he "really loved" the record and branded Evans as being "dope".

Music video
Shooting for the music video began sometime in early August 2014 and took place at Suite Lounge in Atlanta, Georgia. Directed by Derek Blanks and produced by Radiant3 Productions, the music video features choreographic dancing by Lisa Cunningham ("Icy", "Taurus Here") and club references to the Eddie Murphy film Coming to America (1988). The video also features cameo appearances by the likes of Stevie J, Joseline Hernandez, Terrell Owens and Evans' friend and R&B Divas co-star KeKe Wyatt. On August 31, 2014, a sneak peek of the music video was released via Evans' official YouTube channel. The full-length video premiered on Vh1 on September 10, 2014.

Track listings and formats
 iTunes download
 "I Deserve It" (feat. Missy Elliott & Sharaya J)

Chart performance
On June 25, 2014, "I Deserve It" peaked at #1 on Billboard Trending 140 chart, less than 10 hours after its premiere on Faith Evans' official SoundCloud account.

Weekly charts

Release history

References

2014 singles
2014 songs
Faith Evans songs
Missy Elliott songs
Songs written by Missy Elliott
Songs written by Faith Evans
Songs written by Nina Simone